WJML (1110 AM) is a radio station licensed to Petoskey, Michigan, which is owned by John Yob, through licensee Mitten News LLC. The station airs a mixture of liberal and conservative talk, and is simulcast on WJNL 1210 in Kingsley, Michigan, WHAK 960 in Rogers City, Michigan, and FM stations WWMN 106.3 in Thompsonville, Michigan and WYPV 94.5 in Mackinaw City, Michigan, as well as a translator on 101.1 FM in Traverse City, Michigan.

During the 1970s and 1980s, WJML was one of the most successful AM/FM radio combos in northern Michigan. The FM station has long since been sold off, but WJML/WJNL remains one of the most-popular talk stations in northern Michigan.

Early history
In somewhat of a rarity, WJML-FM 98.9 started first, on December 7, 1965, since in most situations, the AM station is usually the first to sign on. In the beginning, the station was an automated MOR format, with one live DJ, Bill Supernaw, in the morning (Supernaw is now the owner of the Cinema III movie theatre in Charlevoix). The station was owned by a Chicago broadcaster who named his station after his three children, John, Michael and Linda. It was one of northern Michigan's first-ever FM stations, and since many folks didn't have an FM radio at the time, an AM station, WJML/1110 was born on December 6, 1966. WJML was at the time the strongest AM station in northern Michigan during the daytime at 10 kW. However, the station was daytime only.

The Music Station
The 1970s saw several changes for WJML-FM/AM as the Harrington family sold the station, following the unexpected death of John Harrington, to a small group that owned WMUS-AM-FM Muskegon, Michigan; KQDS-AM-FM in Duluth Minnesota; and WPLY AM in Plymouth, Wisconsin. On February 14, 1977 WJML flipped from MOR to Top 40.  Tim Achterhoff, an 11-year vet of WMUS at the time, plugged in the programming formula used successfully at the country station... but with a pop/rock playlist. The station was very music-intensive.  News was moved to :54 past the hour, so JML was always in a music-sweep at the top of the hour.  Great on-air talent included: Jay Alexander, Rob Hazelton, Ted Stevens, John Clark [Dennis Martin], Tim Nixon, Tom Tyler, Mike Daniels, Steve Phillips, Kurt Kelly, Art Morrison, Mark Kage, Nick Scott, Dave Walker, Cindy Smith and Sarah Wilson with news... and many more wonderful personalities.  In a year and a half, the JML AMFM combo had more AQH audience than all other stations COMBINED in an 11-county area in a survey conducted by Arbitron. And the advertising revenue poured in... making it future target for plenty of move-ins!  The station also adopted an easily  remembered slogan: "The Music Station." American Top 40 aired on this station starting in 1979.

JML was the first highly structured station in northern Michigan, heavily formatted using liner cards, strict positioning statements, tight playlists, 'big city' sound with Lyle Dean (WLS) and Del Hull doing liners and "Time Bomb" legal ID's: "It's 12noon at The Music Station(sung or spoken)... WJML-FM/AM Petoskey."  From '77 until 1980 JML used jingles from Gwinsound of Dallas (Series 23), later switching to JAM Creative Production's Class Action (WLS) package.
The station had influences from WBBM-Chicago in the news presentation with the standard liner between local news and ABC News: "Tempurature 50, that's 10 Celsius, JML NewsTime 11:56."

If WJML was to be remembered on a national level, it would be the fact that it was the first station ever to pair up Bob Kevoian and Tom Griswold for mornings, aka Bob and Tom. The two met at a Petoskey bar in the late 1970s and have been friends since. However, in 1983, Indianapolis radio station WFBQ lured them away, where they landed in syndication years later.

The 1980s bring changes
In 1983, due to increased competition from upstart rivals WKHQ and WKLT, WJML flipped to adult contemporary. Some of their DJs would answer the phone saying "WJML, The MUZAK Station!". This AC format featured spoken legal ID's and Tuesday Productions' "Whisper" jingles. The jingles made the station sound as if it were embarrassed to say who it was. Several format alterations included a "Light Rock 99" phase. In 1989, the final nail was nailed as WJML was sold to Langer Gokey, the North Dakotan Dr Pepper bottler who also owned WKLT. Gokey's plan was to boost WKLT's power many folds over by moving its signal from 97.7 to 97.5 and have 100 kW WJML-FM, now WKLZ, simulcast WKLT's signal. Gokey, however, was not interested in AM radio at all, so he donated Kalkaska's WKLT 1420 to Kalkaska Schools (the station has since been silenced) and WJML was silenced and put up for sale.

However, shortly after WJML was silenced, local broadcaster Rick Stone (originally started WAIR, was first GM/VP for WMKC) bought the station and flipped it to talk. The rebirthed station was an early success. Stone also upgraded the station's power to 10 watts overnight - barely enough power to cover Petoskey.

In 1999, Petoskey lost its oldies station, WAIR 92.5 FM (now WFDX), when the station, owned by Langer Gokey, flipped unsuccessfully to country "The Bee". In response, WJML played oldies on the weekends and aired talk during the week, which would continue until its sister station WWKK signed on the following year.

Into the 21st century
In 2000, Stone decided to start a second AM in Petoskey giving WJML a sister. That station was WWKK "Kool 750", and at first, it was an oldies outlet. Kool 750 allowed WJML to segue back toward a talk format (though WJML still featured some oldies programming on weekends only for a short time before going back to all talk). Eventually, Petoskey got oldies again on the FM dial as Ross Biederman's WCCW-FM/107.5 Traverse City started simulcasting on WCZW/107.9 in nearby Charlevoix.  This allowed WWKK to flip to talk as well, being a liberal talker while WJML became conservative talk.

Recently, Stone traded WWKK in exchange for Roy Henderson's WLDR 1210 in Traverse City, MI, which allows WJML to have a stronger signal in the Cherry Capital. In preparation for the change, WJML asked listeners what shows they wanted to keep, since both WJML and WWKK could no longer co-exist. The former WWKK is now WOUF 750, simulcasting the country format of WLDR-FM/101.9 in Traverse City.

WJML today
Today, WJML/WJNL airs mostly syndicated programs but does carry some weekly local shows including some sort of "Tradio" program where local businesses trade their products or services for a commercial radio schedule. Such trades are at an inflated trade rate. The stations' current lineup information is grossly outdated here with claims that said programming includes Citadel's Michael Patrick Shiels morning program, as well as Neal Boortz, Glenn Beck, Ed Schultz, Lou Dobbs and Michael Savage as well as libertarian talk show Free Talk Live, and Detroit Pistons basketball games. An attempt was made to clarify this information but even their phone number is no longer in service. WJML has also moved into the newspaper business with its weekly publication of "TALK of the NORTH" Shopping and Entertainment Guide distributed free in Antrim, Charlevoix, Cheboygan, Emmet, Grand Traverse, and Leelanau counties.

On May 29, 2015, WJML's FM repeater in Charlevoix, W235CL on 94.9, signed on, providing 24/7 daytime coverage to the immediate Charlevoix area, with 250 watts of power. Effective August 8, 2016, W235CL moved to 101.1 FM in Traverse City, as W266CS. On January 31, 2017, WJML, WJNL and W266CS were sold to John Yob's Mitten News LLC for $700,000; the sale was consummated on May 23, 2017.

As of May 13, 2018, WJML can now be heard on WWMN 106.3 in Thompsonville, WYPV 94.5 in Mackinaw City and WHAK 960 in Rogers City.

On June 22, 2020 WWMN & WYPV changed their simulcasts to that of album-oriented rock-formatted WQON 100.3 FM Grayling, and no longer broadcast WJML on their signals.

References

Michiguide.com - WJML History

External links

News and talk radio stations in the United States
Radio stations established in 1966
JML
1966 establishments in Michigan